The 2015–16 First Division was the 26th season of Norway's second highest ice hockey league, First Division.

The regular season began play on September 26, 2015, and was concluded on March 2, 2016.

The promotional and relegation playoffs began March 10, and ended March 22, 2016.

Participating teams

Regular season

Standings
Updated as of March 2, 2016.
x – clinched promotional playoff spot; y – clinched regular season league title; r – play in relegation series

Source: hockey.no

Playoffs

Promotional Playoffs

After the regular season has ended, the two lowest ranked teams in the 2015–16 GET-ligaen and the two highest ranked teams in the First Division competed for the right to play in the 2016–17 GET-ligaen. The tournament was organized according to a double round robin format, where each club will played the others twice, home and away, for a total of six games. The points system and ranking method used, was the same as in the regular season.

Standings
Updated as of March 22, 2016.

q – qualified for next years GET-league; r – will play in next years 1. division

Source: hockey.no

Relegation Playoffs

After the regular season had ended, the two lowest ranked teams in the First Division and the two highest ranked teams in the Second Division competed for the right to play in the 2016–17 First Division. The tournament was organized to be played over one weekend, where each club played the others once,  for a total of three games. The points system and ranking method used, is the same as in the regular season. The games was all played in Gjøvik Olympic Cavern Hall.

Standings
Updated as of March 13, 2016.

q – will play in next years 1. division; r – will play in next years 2. division

Source: hockey.no

References

External links
  

2015–16 in European second tier ice hockey leagues
GET-ligaen
Norwegian First Division (ice hockey) seasons